Carolin Martina Leonhardt (born 22 November 1984 in Lampertheim, Hesse) is a German sprint canoer who has competed since the 2000s. She won two medals at the 2004 Summer Olympics in Athens with a gold in the K-4 500 m and a silver in the K-2 500 m events.  At the 2012 Summer Olympics, she won a silver in the K-4 500 m.

Leonhardt has also won fifteen medals at the ICF Canoe Sprint World Championships with six golds (K-4 200 m: 2005, 2007, 2009; K-4 500 m: 2005, 2007; K-1 4 x 200 m: 2011), eight silvers (K-2 1000 m: 2009, 2010, 2013; K-4 200 m 2006, K-4 500 m: 2006, 2009, 2011; K-4 1000 m: 2006), and a bronze (K-4 1000 m: 2005).

References

External links 
 
 
 

1984 births
Living people
People from Lampertheim
Sportspeople from Darmstadt (region)
Canoeists at the 2004 Summer Olympics
Canoeists at the 2012 Summer Olympics
German female canoeists
Olympic canoeists of Germany
Olympic gold medalists for Germany
Olympic silver medalists for Germany
Olympic medalists in canoeing
ICF Canoe Sprint World Championships medalists in kayak
Medalists at the 2012 Summer Olympics
Medalists at the 2004 Summer Olympics